Culprit is one accused of a crime.

Culprit may also refer to:

 Culprit (1917 film), a French silent drama film 
 Culprit (1937 film), a French drama film
 Culprit (band), a heavy metal band
 Culprits, a 1960 Spanish drama film